Cyril Yapi (born 18 February 1980) is a French footballer who played on the professional level for French Ligue 1 club Rennes during the period of 1998-2003 and Italian Serie B club Como during the 2003-2004 season.

References

External links
 

French footballers
1980 births
Living people
Stade Rennais F.C. players
Stade Lavallois players
Como 1907 players
French expatriate footballers
Expatriate footballers in Italy
Ligue 1 players
Ligue 2 players
Serie B players
Association football midfielders
Mediterranean Games bronze medalists for France
Sportspeople from Lorient
Footballers from Brittany
Mediterranean Games medalists in football
Competitors at the 2001 Mediterranean Games